This is a list of universities in South Sudan:

Public universities
 John Garang University of Science and Technology, Bor, 2006
 Rumbek University, Rumbek, 2010
 University of Bahr El-Ghazal, Wau, 1991 
 University of Juba, 1977 
 University of Northern Bahr El-Ghazal, Aweil, 2011 
 Upper Nile University, Malakal, 1991
 Akobo Heritage and Memorial University, Akobo, 2016

Private universities
Brilliant Vision Institute, Juba & Bentiu
 Akobo Health Institute University, Akobo
 African Institute for Health & Social Science, Bentiu, South Sudan Founded in 2014 
 Bright National College – Juba, Wau and Bentiu Unity State founded in 2016
 Bentiu Heritage & Memorial University, planned to be based in Bentiu
 Catholic University of South Sudan, Juba and Wau, 2008
 Mikese University College Yambio South Sudan Founded 2008 Started as internet cape
 Ebony University, based in Greater Bahr-el-Ghazal, Wau
 South Sudan Christian University Juba, founded in 2010
WOI University, P.O.BOX 245 Juba, incorporated on 27 May 2011
 St. Mary's University in Juba, Juba, 2009
 Yei Agricultural and Mechanical University, Yei
 Star international university founded in 2016 Affiliate to Bosoga university Uganda) Juba south Sudan
 Starford International University College founded in 2016
 Remedial University College, Juba, established 2016
 Kampala University South Sudan Center founded in 2015
 University of Faith, Center established 2014
 Islamic University of South Sudan established 2012
 Equatoria International University, Eastern Equatoria State- Torit, 2019
 Attasons University College, Eastern Equatoria State-Torit, 2019
 Rain Computer College, Eastern Equatoria State-Torit, 2019
 South University of Medicine, Science and Technology, Juba, Established 2020
Ayii University, Established in 2020
[Ramciel University, Established in 2021] Juba, Wau, South Sudan

See also
 Education in South Sudan
 Mikese University College, Yambio

References

External links
 University directory at Unesco.org
 Institutions of higher education In Juba, South Sudan

 
Universities
South Sudan
South Sudan